A  (alternately  or ) is a traditional set of Japanese clothing worn by men, women and children during summer. Consisting of a side-tying, tube-sleeved kimono-style top and a pair of trousers,  were originally menswear only, though in recent years, women's  have become popular.

Description
 typically come in a matching set of a top and trousers that are either short or long. Though the trousers resemble Western trousers, the top resembles a kimono, with a wrapped front and a long collar set on a diagonal angle. However, unlike kimono,  typically do not have an overlapping front panel (known as the ), and feature two sets of ties – one inside and the other outside – to fasten the top shut. The top is roughly hip-length, and is wrapped left over right, with the internal ties fastened before the external ones.

Traditional  are made from hemp or cotton, and are typically dyed a solid colour – such as indigo, blue or green – with either a muted or nonexistent pattern. Modern  frequently feature prints ranging from simple textures to complicated and colourful floral patterns. Ladies'  tend to be more brightly coloured, and often feature prints of popular culture characters and motifs.

 seams are very loosely sewn to allow for ventilation during hot weather, and from a distance appear to form a short gap between different fabric pieces.

Use
 are usually worn as a form of nightwear or house clothes, and are considered very informal clothing. Normally,  are typically only worn outside of the house when travelling short distances, such as to go on a local errand, collecting the mail or while shopping.

 can also be used as a substitute for  during the summer months, particularly at summer festivals.

See also

References

External links 
 

Jackets
Japanese full-body garments
Japanese words and phrases
Nightwear
Suits (clothing)
Trousers and shorts